Anopina meredithi is a species of moth of the family Tortricidae. It is found in Costa Rica.

References

Moths described in 2000
meredithi
Moths of Central America